Ella Taylor is a film critic who was a staff writer for the LA Weekly and Village Voice Media, writing film and book reviews, interviews, profiles, and cultural and political commentary from 1989 to 2009, when she and much of the staff were laid off.

She currently writes about film for NPR.org, Village Voice Media, and the New York Times.  She also reviews books for the Los Angeles Times, and she teaches in the Cinema School at the University of Southern California.

She has also written for The Guardian (UK), The Boston Globe Magazine, The Village Voice, Mirabella, Elle, Newsday, the Los Angeles Times Magazine, and the LA Times Book Review.

She has worked in radio, as co-host of KPCC-FM's weekly “Filmweek,” and has appeared on television on KCET-TV on Los Angeles and on BRAVO and the Independent Film Channel.

She's won several awards, including the Greater Los Angeles Press Club National Entertainment Journalism Award in Film Criticism (2008), and the National Entertainment Journalism Award in Film Criticism (2007).

She's the author of the book Prime-Time Families: Television Culture in Post-War America, and a contributor to Quentin Tarantino Interviews, Gerald Peary (ed.), and to 1001 Movies You Must See Before You Die, Steven Jay Schneider (ed.).

She earned a B.A. in Sociology from the London School of Economics, an M.A. Sociology of Mass Communications at Leicester University (UK), and a Ph.D. in Sociology from Brandeis University.

Bibliography
Prime-Time Families: Television Culture in Post-War America (1991)

References

External links
Ella Taylor at npr.org
Ella Taylor archives at laweekly.com
Ella Taylor at New York Times
Ella Taylor at Los Angeles Times
Ella Taylor at The Guardian (UK)
Ella Tayor at Rotten Tomatoes
Ella Taylor at USC School of Cinema

Year of birth missing (living people)
Living people
American film critics
National Society of Film Critics Members
Brandeis University alumni
American women film critics